Paul van der Ploeg (born 9 November 1989) is an Australian cyclist, specializing cross-country mountain biking.

Major results

Road

2013
 1st Stage 1 Tour de Borneo
2015
 1st Prologue Tour de Perth

Cyclo-cross
2015-2016
 1st  National Cyclo-cross Championships

Mountain

2008
 1st  Under-23 National Cross-country Championships
2010
 1st  Under-23 Oceania Cross-country Championships
 1st  Under-23 National Cross-country Championships
2012
 3rd Oceania 4-cross Championships
2013
 1st  World Cross-country Eliminator Championships
 1st  National Cross-country Eliminator Championships
2015
 1st  Oceania Cross-country Eliminator Championships
 1st  National Cross-country Eliminator Championships

References

1989 births
Living people
Australian male cyclists